Mirza Fakhrul Islam Alamgir (born 26 January 1948) is a Bangladeshi politician. He has been the secretary general of the Bangladesh Nationalist Party (BNP) since 2016. He was a member of the parliament for Thakurgaon-1 constituency from 2001 to 2006. In that term, he was also appointed as the Minister of State in charge of the Ministry of Agriculture and later Ministry of Civil Aviation and Tourism.

Early life
Alamgir was born on 26 January 1948 in Thakurgaon District to Mirza Ruhul Amin (d. 2008), a former member of parliament and Mirza Fatima Amin (d. 2018), a homemaker.

Political career

Student politics

Alamgir was active in student politics at Dhaka University. He was a member of the then East Pakistan Students Union (EPSU), now known as Bangladesh Students Union, and was elected as the secretary general of the organization's SM Hall unit in the university. Alamgir rose through the ranks of EPSU and, at the height of the 1969 uprising against the Ayub Khan administration, he was elected as the organization's Dhaka University president.

Teaching and other government positions
In 1972, Alamgir became a teacher of economics at Dhaka College.

Among other government responsibilities, Alamgir worked for the Bangladesh government's Directorate of Inspection and Audit as an auditor.

Alamgir served in the administration of President Ziaur Rahman. He worked as a secretary of Deputy Prime Minister S.A. Bari, and State Minister Amirul Islam Kalam until the latter resigned in 1982. Following this, Alamgir taught economics at Thakurgaon Govt. College until 1986.

Entry into politics
In 1986, with the municipal polls ahead, Alamgir resigned from his government post. He ran for chairman in Thakurgaon municipality in the 1988 municipal elections as a neutral candidate, and won.

Alamgir joined BNP amid the countrywide uprising to topple the military regime of Gen Hussain Muhammad Ershad in the early 1990s. In 1992, Alamgir was nominated as president of the BNP's Thakurgaon district unit.

Member of parliament and state minister
Alamgir ran in the 5th parliamentary election in 1991 from Thakurgaon-1 constituency on the BNP ticket but lost to Awami League candidate Khademul Islam. He lost to another Awami League candidate again in the 7th parliamentary election in 1996, but this time with a very narrow margin: 51%–47%.

In the 8th parliamentary election in 2001, as a BNP candidate, Alamgir beat Awami League candidate Ramesh Chandra Sen by 37,962 votes, garnering 134,910 votes.

The government newly formed by Alamgir's BNP party appointed him Minister of State in charge of the Ministry of Agriculture. A cabinet reshuffle later named him Minister of State in charge of the Ministry of Civil Aviation and Tourism, where he served until the BNP government left office in October 2006.

Alamgir ran again in the 9th parliamentary election in 2008, losing marginally to the Awami League candidate he previously beat, Ramesh Chandra Sen.

5th BNP Council

The 5th National Council of BNP in December 2008 named Alamgir senior joint secretary general, a post previously held by Tarique Rahman (now the  vice-chairman of the BNP).

Alamgir became well known in Bangladesh for his frequent appearance in the media as the BNP's spokesperson, particularly as leader of the opposition to the Awami League-led government that took office in January 2009.

BNP’s acting secretary general
Alamgir was named acting secretary general of the BNP by its chairperson, Begum Khaleda Zia, following the death of secretary general Khandaker Delwar Hossain in March 2011. Some senior BNP figures disputed the nomination, stating that the BNP constitution does not allow for this. The dispute was ruled out on 21 March 2011, hours before Zia left for Saudi Arabia at invitation of the Saudi royal family.

Alamgir continued criticizing the government vibrantly on different issues. Upon organizing mass anti-government showdowns, he warned the government to not obstruct the opposition events. The party organized a number of countrywide populous showdowns and agitations against the government, most notably on the issue of the caretaker government, which the Awami League government demolished, enforcing its decisive two-thirds majority in the parliament in 2011.

Alamgir's motorcade came under a violent attack by an armed mob in Lakshmipur on 2 August 2011 as it was approaching the main town where Alamgir was about to attend a party meeting. The attackers were not identified, but Alamgir and his companions alleged that they were members of the ruling party, the Awami League. Though Alamgir was unhurt, three vehicles (including the one in which he was riding) were vandalized, and ten people were injured.

In February 2012, Alamgir criticized the government for its role in the Pilkhana massacre. He claimed the violence was intended to permanently damage the national security of Bangladesh and accused the Awami League government of not properly investigating the incident.

As of March 2012, Alamgir is one of the top contenders to fill the post of BNP's secretary general.

Personal life
Alamgir is married to Rahat Ara Begum, who attended University of Calcutta and presently works in an insurance company in Dhaka. The couple has two daughters, Mirza Shamaruh and Mirza Safaruh. Shamaruh attended University of Dhaka and was a teacher in the institution.  She is now a post doctoral fellow in Australia. Safaruh, also a University of Dhaka graduate, teaches in a school in Dhaka.

Alamgir's uncle, Mirza Ghulam Hafiz, was a BNP politician who served as the Minister of Land (1978–79), Minister of Law, Justice, and Parliamentary Affairs (1991–96), and was elected MP from a Dhaka constituency in 1979. Hafiz was the speaker of the 2nd national parliament of Bangladesh (1979–82).

Another uncle, Wing Commander S. R. Mirza, served in the first government of Bangladesh that was formed in exile (the  Mujibnagar Government) in April 1971. He was named to head the newly formed Directorate of Youth Camps that oversaw training facilities for freedom fighter recruits in 1971.

References

Living people
1948 births
People from Thakurgaon District
University of Dhaka alumni
Academic staff of Dhaka College
Bangladesh Nationalist Party politicians
General Secretaries of Bangladesh Nationalist Party
8th Jatiya Sangsad members
State Ministers of Agriculture (Bangladesh)
State Ministers of Tourism and Civil Aviation (Bangladesh)
11th Jatiya Sangsad members